Châtillon-en-Diois is a commune in the Drôme department in southeastern France. On 1 January 2019, the former commune Treschenu-Creyers was merged into Châtillon-en-Diois.

Population

See also
Communes of the Drôme department
Parc naturel régional du Vercors

References

Communes of Drôme